Nana Kobina Osoh (born 15 September 2001) is a Ghanaian professional footballer who plays as a midfielder for Ghanaian Premier League side Techiman Eleven Wonders FC. He is also a member of the Ghana national under-20 football team. He previously played for Maccabi Petah Tikva on loan.

Career

Early career 
Osoh started his career with Ghana Division Two League side Golden Kick Sporting Club before moving to Israel on a season long loan deal.

Maccabi Petah Tikva (loan) 
In September 2020, Maccabi Petah Tikva signed Osoh on a season long loan deal and assigned him to their U-19 side to booster their side in the UEFA Youth League. He played two matches for the U-19 side in the 2019–20 UEFA Youth League.

Techiman Eleven Wonders (loan) 
Osoh began his career in the Ghana Premier league with Bono-side Techiman Eleven Wonders, moving to the club on loan ahead of the 2020–21 Ghana Premier League. He made his professional debut on 3 January 2021 in a 1–0 loss match against International Allies, coming on a substitute for Abu Musa Sule in the 57th minute. He scored his first professional goal in a match against Karela United, scoring in the 79th minute after coming on in the 76th minute for McCarthy Ofori to help Eleven Wonders win by 3–1.

References

External links 
 Nana Kobina Osoh on UEFA Youth League
 
 

Living people
2001 births
Association football forwards
Ghanaian footballers
Ghana Premier League players
Ghana under-20 international footballers
Ghana youth international footballers
Ghanaian expatriate sportspeople in Israel
Ghanaian expatriate footballers
Techiman Eleven Wonders FC players